Biofabrication is a branch of biotechnology specialising in the research and development of biologically engineered processes for the automated production of biologically functional products through bioprinting or bioassembly and subsequent tissue maturation processes; as well as techniques such as directed assembly, which employs localised external stimuli guide the fabrification process; enzymatic assembly, which utilises selective biocatalysts to build macromolecular structures; and self-assembly, in which the biological material guides its own assembly according to its internal information. These processes may facilitate fabrication at the micro- and nanoscales. Biofabricated products are constructed and structurally organised with a range of biological materials including bioactive molecules, biomaterials, living cells, cell aggregates such as micro-tissues and micro-organs on chips, and hybrid cell-material constructs.

See also

References

Works cited 

 
 

Biological engineering
Biotechnology